Geniostoma uninervium is a species of flowering plant in the Loganiaceae family. It is endemic to Fiji.

References

Endemic flora of Fiji
uninervium
Least concern plants
Taxonomy articles created by Polbot